The 2014 Colorado Buffaloes football team represented the University of Colorado at Boulder during the 2014 NCAA Division I FBS football season. Led by second-year head coach Mike MacIntyre, the Buffaloes played their home games on-campus at Folsom Field in Boulder and were members of the South Division of the Pac-12 Conference. They finished the season 2–10, 0–9 in Pac-12 play to finish in last place in the South Division.

Previous season
Colorado finished the 2013 season with a record of 4–8, 1–8 in Pac-12 play, and last place in the South Division.

Schedule

Game summaries

Colorado State

Massachusetts

Arizona State

Hawaii

California

Oregon State

USC

UCLA

Washington

Arizona

Oregon

Utah

References

Colorado
Colorado Buffaloes football seasons
Colorado Buffaloes football